The International Diabetes Federation (IDF) is an umbrella organization of over 230 national diabetes associations in more than 160 countries and territories.  The Federation has been leading the global diabetes community since 1950. It is headquartered in Brussels, Belgium. It represents the interests of the growing number of people with diabetes and those at risk. IDF's mission is to promote diabetes care, prevention and a cure worldwide.

According to the latest IDF figures, there are currently 463 million people living with diabetes and the total is expected to rise to 700 million by 2045. Over 75% of people with diabetes live in low- and middle-income countries and half of adults living with diabetes are undiagnosed.

Organization
IDF is divided into seven regions, with the aim of strengthening the work of national diabetes associations and enhancing the collaboration between them. IDF's national diabetes associations are divided into the following regions: Africa (AFR), Europe (EUR), Middle East and North Africa (MENA), North America and Caribbean (NAC), South and Central America (SACA), South East Asia (SEA) and Western Pacific (WP).

IDF's working bodies bring together the most important stakeholders from the global diabetes community in a collaborative effort to set common goals and co-ordinate activities towards the attainment of these goals. These stakeholders include: people with diabetes and their families; professionals involved in diabetes healthcare and related fields; diabetes representative organizations, and partners from commercial organizations with concerns which align with the mission of the Federation. IDF is associated with the Department of Public Information of the United Nations and is in official relations with the World Health Organization.

Projects and activities
IDF conducts a number of activities and projects. These include advocacy and lobbying work, education for people with diabetes and their healthcare providers, public awareness and health improvement campaigns, as well as the promotion of the free exchange of diabetes knowledge. A few examples include:
 World Diabetes Day, the primary awareness campaign of the diabetes world, marked every year on 14 November. As a result of the passage of United Nations Resolution 61/225 in December 2006, World Diabetes Day is an official United Nations day. The campaign is represented by the blue circle, the global symbol of diabetes.
 The IDF World Congress , organised every two years, which provides a unique and international forum to discuss a wide variety of diabetes-related topics. The next IDF Congress will be held in Bangkok, Thailand on 6–9 December 2021.
 The Diabetes Atlas, a unique resource on diabetes for a wide range of audiences including decision-makers, public health authorities, healthcare professionals and educators.
 The IDF School of Diabetes, an online educational platform aimed at improving the knowledge and skills of health professionals working in diabetes.

References

External links
 International Diabetes Federation

Diabetes organizations
International medical and health organizations
International organisations based in Belgium